Snooker at the 2019 African Games was held from 20 to 24 August 2019 in Casablanca, Morocco.

In January 2019, it was announced that snooker would be included as a medal event at the 2019 African Games.

Five countries were scheduled to compete in snooker but competitors from Algeria and Tunisia did not start in their events.

Participating nations

Medal table

Medal summary

References

External links 
 Results

2019 African Games
African Games
2019 African Games
2019